Rebels is the first English-language studio album by Mexican pop group RBD, released on December 19, 2006.

The album contains songs from the group's previous studio albums that were translated into English for the release, as well as new songs that were recorded exclusively for the album. Rebels falls into the genres of Latin pop and pop rock, with dance-pop and R&B stylings, which were new music styles for the group.

To promote the album, only two official singles were released off the album. On September 22, 2006, the album's lead single was released, a ballad titled "Tu Amor", which was composed by Diane Warren. With the song, the group won the Les Etoiles Cherie award in France for 'International Song of the Year' and a Mi TRL award for 'Best Music Video'. The album's second single was "Wanna Play", which was released only in the United States. The single did not have an accompanying music video. The third and last single to be released from the album was planned to be "Money Money", but the song only managed to be released as a promotional single in Spain on December 19, 2006.

On March 21, 2007, a deluxe edition of the album, titled We Are RBD, was released only in Japan. The deluxe edition included two new cover tracks: "Let the Music Play" and "Gone" which was previously recorded by Kelly Clarkson for her 2004 album, Breakaway.

RBD member Christian Chávez mentioned that Rebels would be re-released in late 2007 or early 2008 and that the new version would contain new songs and a collaboration with the Black Eyed Peas on one of the tracks. The group's next single off the album was expected to be featured on this future re-release. Billboard magazine even published that the re-release would happen in early 2008 and it would feature three hip hop-influenced songs. When the group disbanded in 2009, nothing about the re-release was announced, so it is assumed to be canceled.

Album information

On November 21, 2006, RBD released their third Spanish language studio album, Celestial. Almost simultaneously, Rebels was released as RBD's first English-language album on December 19, 2006 in the United States; the jewel case booklet of previous album Celestial initially announced that the album would come out a bit later on December 26, 2006. The album leaked onto the Internet on December 9, 2006. The album had Pedro Damián as its executive producer and was recorded in California, New York City and Mexico City.

The album contains eight songs which were originally from the group's former Spanish albums that were re-recorded in English:
 
"Connected" ("Tenerte y Quererte" from Rebelde)
"Keep It Down Low" ("Solo Quédate en Silencio" from Rebelde)
"Save Me" ("Sálvame" from Rebelde)
"Happy Worst Day" ("Feliz Cumpleaños" from Nuestro Amor)
"This Is Love" ("Nuestro Amor" from Nuestro Amor)
"Gone" ("Me Voy" from Nuestro Amor)
"My Philosophy" ("Dame" from Celestial)
"I Wanna Be the Rain" ("Quisiera Ser" from Celestial)

The album's first track and lead single, "Tu Amor", was written by famous songwriter Diane Warren, who also composed the song "I Wanna Be the Rain". "I Wanna Be the Rain" was first recorded in English, and then it was translated to Spanish for the album Celestial, which was released first than Rebels. "Connected" has been covered by several different artists, such as Sara Paxton, Katharine McPhee, Amy Diamond, Melissa Lyons (with Cassidy Ladden), and Suzanne Shaw. The song "Money Money" is a reggaeton song that samples the group's previous hit in this genre, "Lento". Both were produced by reggaeton production duo Luny Tunes. Despite the English title, it's the only track on the album that is mainly sung in Spanish.

The song "Gone", featured in the Japanese deluxe edition of the album, entitled We Are RBD, is a cover of a Kelly Clarkson song from her album Breakaway. The group had previously recorded a Spanish version of the song (titled "Me Voy") for their second studio album, Nuestro Amor. The album achieved a Gold certification in Japan.

On November 28, 2008, the album was released in Greece. The Greek edition of the album contained a bonus track featuring Greek pop singer Tamta. The song is titled "Agapw Αγαπώ I Love", and serves as the Greeklish remix of "Wanna Play". Two months later, Tamta went and made a Greek version of RBD's signature song "Rebelde", and titled it "Pame Parea".

Rebels was the first RBD studio album to not have a Portuguese language version.

Promotion

Singles 

The album's first single was "Tu Amor", which was released on September 22, 2006. The song was composed by Diane Warren. The single officially debuted on the KISS-FM radio station in Los Angeles, California, after having been leaked on the Internet before its official launch date. The single won the Les Etoiles Cherie FM award in France for 'International Song of the Year', and the Mi TRL Award for 'Best Music Video'. The song's music video was filmed in a beach in Los Angeles and was premiered by MTV Tr3s on October 23, 2006. The song's main vocals are performed solely by Christian Chávez.

The second single, released on December 17, 2006 only in the United States, was "Wanna Play". The song was composed by Andrea Martin and RedOne. The single, however, did not have the promotional support of a music video.

Lastly, the album's third single, "Money Money", was released on December 19, 2006 only in Spain. No music video was released to promote the single.

Live performances 
RBD performed live various songs from Rebels on radio and television throughout 2006 and 2007.

In the 2006 edition of Walmart Soundcheck, a performance series by Walmart retail chain to promote albums being released, the group performed the album's first official single, "Tu Amor", for the first time. On November 24, 2006, after their English interview on Yahoo! Music, they also performed "Tu Amor".
In 2007, the group appeared on the US music TV show CD USA, where they also performed "Tu Amor", as well as "My Philosophy", "Wanna Play", "This Is Love", "I Wanna Be the Rain" and "Save Me".
 
On May 28, 2007, the group was invited by American businessman Donald Trump to appear on the year's biggest beauty pageant, Miss Universe 2007. The event took place on the Auditorio Nacional in Mexico City, where the group performed a medley of the songs "Wanna Play", "Cariño Mío", and "Money Money". On July 25, 2007, the group performed their single "Tu Amor" on the acoustic music TV show Confesiones en Concierto on Ritmoson Latino.

Also in 2007, the group participated for a second time on "Walmart Soundcheck". This time, they performed the tracks "Cariño Mío" and "Money Money" to continue the promotion for Rebels, as well as other tracks from their Spanish album Celestial.

Tour 

Although the album did not count with an exclusive concert tour to promote it, the album's songs were included in RBD's third worldwide concert tour, the Tour Celestial. The concert tour included performances of the songs "Cariño Mío", "Wanna Play", "Money Money", "I Wanna Be the Rain", and "Tu Amor". The tour visited the United States and Europe, as well as Central and South America. The band also continued to increase their string of successes internationally; the band's visits to Romania and Spain during 2007 surprised the Latin American entertainment industry, while giving the band the opportunity to win over the Spanish music market, one of the most competitive music markets in the world.

On June 22, 2007, as a result of their successful performances in Spain as part of the Tour Celestial, in a unique concert in the Vicente Calderón Stadium in Madrid in front of 40,000 people, RBD recorded their third live album and live concert video, where the group displayed their unique material and their command of the stage.

In early October 2007, however, it was announced through Roptus.com that the rest of the tour was postponed until later announcement. The reason given through RBD's website was that the group wanted to give their public a better show by performing songs from their then upcoming album, which would be released on November 20, 2007. With the tour, RBD collected $5,400,000 in ticket sales just in North America, and sold a combined total of 293,742 tickets to their concerts worldwide.

Critical reception 

The album received mostly mixed reviews. Jason Birchmeier of AllMusic commented that the album's lead single, "Tu Amor", was "perfect for the project" due to its "simplicity" and "production". He also commented similarly about the tracks "Wanna Play" and "Cariño Mío" due to their "light yet trendy reggaeton production style." However, he ended his review by stating: "Unfortunately, the remainder of the 11 songs are mildly disappointing."

Denise Sheppard, editorial reviewer on Amazon.com, went on to describe the album and gave a background commentary on RBD's success, yet stated: "Since most of RBD are TV veterans, it's safe to say that some are perhaps more gifted actors than they are singers (consider Dulce María's painful Britney-on-helium whine). Thankfully, the songwriting is left up to the pros who provide a consistent balance of teen-friendly top-40 pop, largely centered around two topics: love and the loss of love. "Tu Amor" and "My Philosophy" are two examples of straight-up boy-band style love songs with a Latin hue; the group occasionally brings in a somewhat gruff reggaeton sound ("Cariño Mío", "Wanna Play") which is where they shine the brightest. There is admittedly very little that is rebellious about RBD, but their devoted audience clearly loves them just the way they are."

Users of the MSN Music online service, however, gave the album a very positive four-and-a-half star rating.

Commercial performance
In North America, the album received at best a lukewarm reception. In the United States the album debuted at number 40 on the Billboard 200 album chart with first-week sales of 94,000 copies. On the day of release, the album's cover artwork was altered by changing the group's logo from white to pink. Ironically, the band's third Spanish-language album, Celestial, sold 137,000 copies in its debut week in the United States and peaked at number 15 on the Billboard 200, selling 43,000 more copies than Rebels in its first week. On its second week out, sales of Rebels in the United States plummeted 68%, despite that the album dropped only nine positions on the Billboard 200. In total, the album has sold 225,000 copies in the United States as of 2008, according to Nielsen SoundScan. In Mexico, the album charted poorly considering the success of the group's previous releases, only managing to reach No. 74 on the Mexican Albums Chart, its peak position. With all, the album managed to be certified Gold by the Asociación Mexicana de Productores de Fonogramas y Videogramas (AMPROFON) for the sales of 50,000 copies.

The album received a more welcome reception in Europe. In Spain, the album debuted at No. 3 on the Spanish Albums Chart, reached No. 1 on its second week on the chart and kept the number-one position for two weeks straight. The album was listed at No. 30 on the best-selling albums of 2007 year-end chart in Spain, according to PROMUSICAE. With that, Productores de Música de España (PROMUSICAE) granted the album a Gold certification for its sales of 20,000 copies in Spain.

In South America, the album also received a good reception since its release. In Brazil, the album reached the No. 1 position on the Brazilian Albums Chart.

Almost unexpectedly, the album received an excellent reception in Asia, particularly in Japan, where the Recording Industry Association of Japan (RIAJ) granted the album a Gold certification for the sales of 100,000 copies in the country. Rebels has sold some 2.5 million copies worldwide.

Track listing 

Track notes
"Tu Amor" was originally recorded by American singer Jon B. on his album Cool Relax (1997).
"My Philosophy" is the English version of RBD's own original Spanish song "Dame" (2006).
"Connected" had been previously recorded by several different artists, such as Sara Paxton, Katharine McPhee, Amy Diamond, and Suzanne Shaw. "Connected" had also been previously recorded in Spanish by RBD themselves as "Tenerte y Quererte", which appeared on the band's debut album, Rebelde (2004).
"I Wanna Be the Rain" is the English version of RBD's own "Quisiera Ser", from their third Spanish studio album, Celestial (2006).
"Keep It Down Low" is the English version of RBD's own original Spanish song "Solo Quédate en Silencio" (2004).
"Happy Worst Day" was originally recorded by Swedish singer Mikeyla. RBD had previously covered the song in Spanish for their second studio album, Nuestro Amor (2005).
"This Is Love" is the English version of RBD's own original Spanish song "Nuestro Amor" (2005).
"Save Me" is the English version of RBD's own original Spanish song "Sálvame" (2005).
"Money Money" samples RBD's own "Lento" (2006). Both were produced by reggaeton production duo Luny Tunes.
"Let the Music Play" was originally recorded by American singer Shannon for her album of the same name (1984). Aside from being included on the Japanese deluxe edition of Rebels, the track was also featured as an iTunes digital download exclusive. The track was not included on the physical standard or bonus track editions of the album itself.
"Gone" is a cover of Kelly Clarkson's song from her album Breakaway (2004). RBD had previously recorded a Spanish version of the song "Me Voy" for their second studio album, Nuestro Amor (2005), titled "Me Voy".

Miscellaneous notes
In Wal-Mart stores, the album came in a special edition that included an exclusive live EP containing original live performance songs by RBD and a bonus video of the making of Rebels.
The Japanese edition of the album, named We Are RBD, is also the album's deluxe edition and came with 2 bonus tracks in addition to the standard Rebels tracklist, though the track order was slightly rearranged. The deluxe edition of the album also came with an autographed picture.
An exclusive Fan Pack through Target stores included the Rebels album, a T-shirt, and buttons.
The album included a free RBD 2007 calendar if purchased through K-Mart stores.
If ordered through FYE.com, the album included a free RBD Rebels lithograph.

Personnel 
Credits adapted from the album's liner notes.

Recording locations

 Igloo Music Studios (Burbank, California)
 Ndahouse (Encino, California)
 Realsongs Studios D and W (Hollywood, California)

 Cosmos Studios 1 and 2 (Mexico City, Mexico)
 Studio 19 (Mexico City, Mexico)
 Integrated Studios (New York City)

Mixing locations

 Igloo Music Studios (Burbank, California)
 Realsongs Studios D and W (Hollywood, California)
 Cosmos Studios 1 and 2 (Mexico City, Mexico)

 AUM Studios (New York City)
 Integrated Studios (New York City)
 Plug in Tunes Studios (Queens, New York)

Mastered at
Bernie Grundman Mastering (Hollywood, California)

Vocals

RBD – main vocals, background vocals
Armando Ávila – background vocals
Martín Cintrón – background vocals
Khris Kellow – background vocals

Bambi – background vocals
Carlos Murguía – background vocals
Andy Vargas – background vocals

Musicians

Armando Ávila – bass, drums, guitars, keyboards, Mellotron
Abraham Laboriel – bass
Javier Barrera – drums
Greg Bissonette – drums
Martín Cintrón – guitars
Brian Kahanek – guitars

Carlos Lara – guitars
Güido Laris – guitars, keyboards
RedOne – guitars, instruments
Peter Stengaard – instruments
Carlos Murguía – keyboards
Javier Calderón – lead guitar 

Production

Chris Anokute – A&R
Camilo Lara – A&R
Melissa Mochulske – A&R
Armando Ávila – arrangements, mixing, producer
Khris Kellow – arrangements, producer, programming, vocal production
Güido Laris – arrangements, programming
Andrea Martin – arrangements, producer, vocal production
Carlos Murguía – arrangements, programming
RedOne – arrangements, drum programming, producer
Peter Stengaard – arrangements, mixing, producer, programming
Kate McGregor – art coordination
Edward Taylor – art direction, graphic design
Luis Luisillo Miguel – associate producer
Lynda Thomas – background vocals direction
Carolina Palomo – coordinator
Sean Mosher-Smith – creative direction 
Carlos Lara – direction, lead vocal direction, producer, vocal production
Mario Luccy – engineer, mixing, recording engineer
Emilio Ávila – executive producer
Pedro Damián – executive producer
Michael Anthony Rodríguez – executive producer
Diane Warren – executive producer
Sara Klinger – executive producer assistant 
Televisa En Vivo – management
Bernie Grundman – mastering
Gustavo Borner – mixing, recording engineer
Orlando Calzada – mixing, recording engineer
Nick Nastasi – mixing assistant, producer, recording engineer, recording engineer assistant
Marina Chávez – photography
Los Presidentes – producers
Luny Tunes – producers
Evan V. McCulloch – producer
Claydes Ahmad Smith – producer, vocal arrangement
Ryan William Stokes – producer
Rotger Rosas – production assistant
Jorge González – production coordinator
Tyler Coomes – programming
Héctor Crisantes – recording engineer
Brian Kahanek – recording engineer
Juan Carlos Moguel – recording engineer
Fernando Roldán – recording engineer
Ignacio Segura – recording engineer assistant
Ruy Fulguera – string arrangement
Eric Archibald – styling
Sergio Zamudio – vocal direction

Charts

Certifications

Release history

References

RBD albums
2006 albums
Virgin Records albums
Albums produced by Luny Tunes
Articles containing video clips